is a former Japanese football player.

Playing career
Miyashita was born in Hokkaido on October 10, 1975. After graduating from Kokushikan University, he joined Japan Football League club Omiya Ardija in 1998. The club was promoted to J2 League from 1999. He played many matches as midfielder. He retired end of 2001 season.

Club statistics

References

External links

1975 births
Living people
Kokushikan University alumni
Association football people from Hokkaido
Japanese footballers
J2 League players
Japan Football League (1992–1998) players
Omiya Ardija players
Association football midfielders